Anti-schooling activism or radical education reform describes positions that are critical of school as a learning institution and/or compulsory schooling laws or multiple attempts and approaches to fundamentally change the school system respectively. People of this movement usually advocate alternatives to the traditional school system, education independent from school, the absence of the concept of schooling as a whole, or at least the right that people can choose where and how they are educated.

These attitudes criticize the learning atmosphere and environment of school and oppose the educational monopoly of school and conventional standard and practice of schooling for reasons such as the use of compulsory schooling as a tool of assimilation, the belief that an overly structured and predetermined learning system can be detrimental for children and that the school environment often prevents learning rather than encouraging the innate natural curiosity by using unnatural extrinsic pressures like grades, or the conviction that schooling is used as a form of political or governmental control for the implementation of certain ideologies in the population. Another very persistent reason is that they think that school does not prepare children for the life outside of school and that many teachers do not have a neutral view of the world because they have only attended academic institutions a large part of their life. Others criticize the forced contact in school and are of the opinion that school makes children spend a large part of their most important development phase in a building fobbed off from society exclusively with children in their own age group, seated and entrusted with the task of obeying the orders of one authority figure for several hours each day.

Some may also feel a deep aversion to school based on their personal experiences or question the efficiency and sustainability of school learning and are of the opinion that compulsory schooling represents an impermissible interference with the rights and freedoms of parents and children; and believe that schools for knowledge transfer purposes are no longer necessary and increasingly becoming obsolete and therefore consider compulsory education (which would also include tested autodidacts) to be more sensible than compulsory school attendance laws.

Arguments

Teaching as political/government control
A non-curriculum, non-instructional method of teaching was advocated by Neil Postman and Charles Weingartner in their book Teaching as a Subversive Activity. In inquiry education students are encouraged to ask questions which are meaningful to them, and which do not necessarily have easy answers; teachers are encouraged to avoid giving answers.

Murray N. Rothbard argues that the history of the drive for compulsory schooling is not guided by altruism, but by a desire to coerce the population into a mold desired by dominant forces in society.

John Caldwell Holt asserts that youths should have the right to control and direct their own learning, and that the current compulsory schooling system violates a basic fundamental right of humans: the right to decide what enters our minds. He thinks that freedom of learning is part of freedom of thought, even more fundamental a human right than freedom of speech. He especially states that forced schooling, regardless of whether the student is learning anything whatsoever, or if the student could more effectively learn elsewhere in different ways, is a gross violation of civil liberties.

Nathaniel Branden adduces government should not be permitted to remove children forcibly from their homes, with or without the parents' consent, and subject the children to educational training and procedures of which the parents may or may not approve. He also claims that citizens should not have their wealth expropriated to support an educational system which they may or may not sanction, and to pay for the education of children who are not their own. He claims this must be true for anyone who understands and is consistently committed to the principle of individual rights. He asserts that the disgracefully low level of education in America today is the predictable result of a state-controlled school system, and that the solution is to bring the field of education into the marketplace.

The corruption of children – Rousseau
Jean-Jacques Rousseau wrote in his book Emile: or, On Education (first published in 1762) that all children are perfectly designed organisms, ready to learn from their surroundings so as to grow into virtuous adults, but due to the malign influence of corrupt society, they often fail to do so. Rousseau advocated an educational method which consisted of removing the child from society—for example, to a country home—and alternately conditioning them through changes to environment and setting traps and puzzles for them to solve or overcome.

Rousseau was unusual in that he recognized and addressed the potential of a problem of legitimation for teaching. He advocated that adults always be truthful with children, and in particular that they never hide the fact that the basis for their authority in teaching was purely one of physical coercion: "I'm bigger than you." Once children reached the age of reason, at about 12, they would be engaged as free individuals in the ongoing process of their own.

Grading – Illich
In Deschooling Society, Ivan Illich calls for the disestablishment of schools. He claims that schooling confuses teaching with learning, grades with education, diplomas with competence, attendance with attainment, and, especially, process with substance. He writes that schools do not reward real achievement, only processes. Schools inhibit a person's will and ability to self-learn, ultimately resulting in psychological impotence. He claims that forced schooling perverts the victims’ natural inclination to grow and learn and replaces it with the demand for instruction. Further, the current model of schooling, replete with credentials, betrays the value of a self-taught individual. Moreover, institutionalized schooling seeks to quantify the unquantifiable – human growth.

Effects on local culture and economics 
In some cases schooling has been used as a tool for assimilation and a both deliberate and inadvertent tool to change local culture and economics into another form. Opponents of this effect argue it is a human right for a culture to be maintained, and education can violate this human right. Forced schooling has been used to forcibly assimilate Native Americans in the United States and Canada, which some have said is cultural genocide. Many psychologists believe the forced assimilation of native cultures has contributed to their high suicide rates and poverty. Western education encourages Western modes of survival and economic systems, which can be worse and poorer than the existing modes of survival and economic systems of an existing culture.

School related stress and depression 
There are many factors that can cause schooling to be source of stress and depression in a person's life, which can have long-term health effects and mental disorders. School bullying can lead to depression and long term emotional damage. Societal and familial academic pressure and rigorous schooling can also lead to stress, depressions, and suicide. Academic pressure and rigorous schooling has been pointed to as a cause of the high rate of suicide among South Korean adolescents. General boredom from school can also cause stress, and low academic performance can lead to low self esteem. A student's family can suffer from academic related stress as well.

Ineffective or counter to its purpose 
Some of the proposed purposes of western style compulsory education are to prepare students to join the adult workforce and be financially successful, have students learn useful skills and knowledge, and prepare students to make positive economic or scientific contributions to society. Critics of schooling say it is ineffective at achieving these purposes and goals. In many countries, schools do not keep up with the skills demanded by the workplace, or never have taught relevant skills. Students often feel unprepared for college as well. More schooling does not necessarily correlate with greater economic growth. Alternate forms of schooling, such as the Sudbury model, have been shown to be sufficient for college acceptance and other western cultural goals.

Instead of being a way out of poverty and a way to stay away from crime, for many, school has the opposite effect. Schooling often perpetuates poverty and class divisions. At many schools, students are introduced to gangs, drugs and crime. The school to prison pipeline also converts children into criminals through overly harsh punishments. Punishments from truancy and other school related laws also adversely effect students and parents.

See also
 John Taylor Gatto
 John Holt (educator)
Bertrand Stern
Ivan Illich
 Philosophy of education
 Sudbury school
 Autodidacticism
 Unschooling
 Deschooling
 Deschooling Society
 Indigenous education § Criticism of the Western educational model
 Democratic education
 Student-directed teaching
Alternative education

References

Activism by issue
Compulsory education
Alternative education
Education activism
Education reform